Hilltop Heritage Middle School , formerly known as Jason Lee Middle School and originally as West Intermediate School, was the first and largest of six intermediate schools funded in 1923. It was created on the former campus of the College of Puget Sound (now the University of Puget Sound) at 6th Avenue and North Sprague Avenue in Tacoma, Washington by architect Roland E. Borhek. The school was named after the notable missionary Jason Lee, but was later renamed to distance itself from the questionable methods of reeducating Native Peoples carried out by the pioneer. Hilltop Heritage has about 39 teachers educating over 600 students.

References

External links
Official Website

North Tacoma, Washington
Schools in Tacoma, Washington
Public middle schools in Washington (state)